Percy Douglas Fitton (1881–1946), was a male badminton player from England.

Badminton career
Fitton born in Hendon  was a winner of the All England Open Badminton Championships. He won the men's doubles in 1911.

References

English male badminton players
1881 births
1946 deaths